Alfred Hyde Cockayne  (23 May 1880 – 21 October 1966) was a New Zealand botanist, agricultural scientist and administrator. He was born in Dunedin, or Oamaru, New Zealand, on 23 May 1880. He was the son of another noted botanist Leonard Cockayne.

Honours 

In the 1937 Coronation Honours, Cockayne was made a Companion of the Imperial Service Order. In the 1957 Queen's Birthday Honours, he was appointed a Commander of the Order of the British Empire, for services to agriculture.

References

1880 births
1966 deaths
New Zealand agronomists
20th-century New Zealand botanists
Place of death missing
Place of birth unknown
New Zealand Commanders of the Order of the British Empire
New Zealand Companions of the Imperial Service Order
People from Otago